Jessica Marie Catherine van Eijs (born 8 August 1981 in Nijmegen) is a Dutch politician serving as a member of the House of Representatives since 2017. She is a member of the Democrats 66 (D66).

In 2012, she became a member of the municipal council of Eindhoven, a position she left upon the 2017 general election. Van Eijs is a proponent of efforts for Dutch Sign Language to receive official recognition as a minority language. Hard-of-hearing herself, she has a personal understanding of the needs of the deaf community.

References

1981 births
Living people
Democrats 66 politicians
Dutch women in politics
Members of the House of Representatives (Netherlands)
Municipal councillors of Eindhoven
People from Nijmegen